Timbalai Airfield was an airfield located on the western coast of Labuan, Malaysia.

The airfield was built by the Imperial Japanese after occupying Labuan Island. The Japanese airfield was later made unserviceable from Allied bombing raids. During early June 1945, the airfield was captured by the Australian Army.

The airfield is still in use today.

Allied Units Based at Timbalai Airfield

13th Wireless Section (Heavy) "A" Corps Signals

References

Notes

Bibliography
 

Buildings and structures in Labuan
Defunct airports in Malaysia
Transport in Labuan